Philip Smythe may refer to:
 Philip Smythe, 2nd Viscount Strangford, English politician
 Philip Smythe, 4th Viscount Strangford, Church of Ireland clergyman

See also
 Phil Smyth, Australian basketball player and coach